Sybra mimogeminata is a species of beetle in the family Cerambycidae. It was described by Breuning and Ohbayashi in 1964. It contains two subspecies, Sybra mimogeminata carinatipennis and
Sybra mimogeminata mimogeminata.

References

mimogeminata
Beetles described in 1964